Hamadan or Hamedan (Hamedān) (Old Persian: Haŋgmetana, Ecbatana) is the capital city of Hamadan Province of Iran. At the 2019 census, its population was 783,300 in 230,775 families. The majority of people living in Hamadan identify as ethnic Persians.

Hamedan is believed to be among the oldest Iranian cities. It is possible that it was occupied by the Assyrians in 1100 BCE; the Ancient Greek historian, Herodotus, states that it was the capital of the Medes, around 700 BCE.

Hamedan has a green mountainous area in the foothills of the 3,574-meter Alvand Mountain, in the midwest part of Iran. The city is 1,850 meters above sea level.

The major sights of this city are the Ganj Nameh inscription, the Avicenna monument and the Baba Taher monument. The main language in the city is Persian.

History

According to Clifford Edmund Bosworth, "Hamadan is a very old city. It may conceivably, but improbably, be mentioned in cuneiform texts from ca. 1100 BC, the time of Assyrian King Tiglath-pilesar I, but is certainly mentioned by Herodotus who says that the king of Media Diokes built the city of Agbatana or Ekbatana in the 7th century BC."

Hamadan was established by the Medes. It then became one of several capital cities of the Achaemenid Dynasty.

Hamadan is mentioned in the biblical book of Ezra (Ezra 6:2) as the place where a scroll was found giving the Jews permission from King Darius to rebuild the temple in Jerusalem. Its ancient name of Ecbatana is used in the Ezra text. Because it was a mile above sea level, it was a good place to preserve leather documents.

During the Parthian era, Ctesiphon was the capital of the country, and Hamadan was the summer capital and residence of the Parthian rulers. After the Parthians, the Sassanids constructed their summer palaces in this city. In 642 the Battle of Nahavand took place and Hamadan fell into the hands of the Muslim Arabs.

During the rule of the Buyid dynasty, the city suffered much damage. However, the city regained its former glory under the rule of the Buyid ruler Fanna Khusraw. In the 11th century, the Seljuks shifted their capital from Baghdad to Hamadan. In 1220, Hamadan was destroyed by the Mongols during the Mongol invasions of Georgia before the Battle of Khunan. The city of Hamadan, its fortunes following the rise and fall of regional powers, was completely destroyed during the Timurid invasions, but later thrived during the Safavid era.

Thereafter, in the 18th century, Hamadan was surrendered to the Ottomans, but due to the work of Nader Shah, Hamadan was cleared of invaders and, as a result of a peace treaty between Iran and the Ottomans, it was returned to Iran. Hamadan stands on the Silk Road, and even in recent centuries the city enjoyed strong commerce and trade as a result of its location on the main road network in the western region of Iran. In the late 19th century, American missionaries, including James W. Hawkes and Belle Sherwood Hawke, established schools in Hamadan.During World War I, the city was the scene of heavy fighting between Russian and Turko-German forces. It was occupied by both armies, and finally by the British, before it was returned to the control of the Iranian government at the end of the war in 1918.

Climate 
Hamadan province lies in a temperate mountainous region to the east of Zagros. The vast plains of the north and northeast of the province are influenced by strong winds, that almost last throughout the year.

The various air currents of this region are: the north and north west winds of the spring and winter seasons, which are usually humid and bring rainfall. The west-east air currents that blow in the autumn, and the local winds that develop due to difference in air-pressure between the elevated areas and the plains, like the blind wind of the Asad Abad region.

Hamadan is in the vicinity of the Alvand mountains and has a hot-summer mediterranean continental climate (Köppen: Dsa, Trewartha: Dc), in transition with a cold semi-arid climate (Köppen climate classification BSk), with snowy winters. In fact, it is one of the coldest cities in Iran. The temperature may drop below  on the coldest days. Heavy snowfall is common during winter and this can persist for periods of up to two months. During the short summer, the weather is mild, pleasant, and mostly sunny.

Panoramic view

Demographics
According to the survey of 1997, the population of the province of Hamadan was 1,677,957.  Based on official statistics of 1997, the population of Hamadan county was 563,444 people.

Culture

Hamadan is home to many poets and writers. Badi' al-Zaman al-Hamadani, author of the Maqamat, was born here and the 11th-century Iranian poet Baba Taher was interred here. Avicenna, the scientist and writer once lived and worked in Hamadan, he is also buried in the city; the Avicenna Mausoleum was constructed in his honor in 1952.

Hamadan is also said to be among the world's oldest continuously inhabited cities. Iran's Cultural Heritage Organization lists 207 sites of historical and cultural significance in Hamadan. The Tomb of Esther and Mordechai in Hamadan is believed by some to hold the remains of the biblical Esther and her uncle Mordechai.

Hamadan is also well-known for handicrafts like leather, ceramics, and carpets.

Gallery

Sport
PAS Hamedan F.C. were founded on June 9, 2007 after the dissolution of PAS Tehran F.C. The team, along with Alvand Hamedan F.C., is in the Azadegan League.

Some sport complexes in this city include: Qods Stadium, Shahid Mofatteh Stadium, Takhti Sport Complex and the National Stadium of Hamadan.

Education

Before the Persian Constitutional Revolution, education in Hamadan was limited to some Maktab Houses and theological schools.
Fakhrie Mozafari School was the first modern school of Hamadan, which was built after that revolution. Alliance and Lazarist were also the first modern schools founded by foreign institutions in Hamadan.

Some of the popular universities in Hamadan include:
 Bu-Ali Sina University
 Hamadan Medical University
 Hamadan University of Technology
 Islamic Azad University of Hamadan

Notable residents
Hamedan celebrities are divided into 3 categories: pre-Islamic, post-Islamic and contemporary people.

Pre-Islamic celebrities 
Among the pre-Islamic celebrities in Hamedan, we can name Mandana, the mother of Cyrus the Great and the daughter of the last king of Media, Ishtovigo.

Famous names after Islam 
Famous people of Hamedan after Islam are great people such as:

 Baba Taher, Famous poets of the fourth century AH.
 Badi'alzaman Hamedani, author of the oldest book in the art of maqam writing.
 Abul Ali Hassan Attar, a great literature and famous syntax, vocabulary and hadith in the fourth century AH.
 Ibn Salah Hamedani, physician and mathematician of the fifth and sixth centuries AH. 
 Khajeh Rashid al-Din Fazlullah, minister, scientist and expert physician of the sixth and seventh centuries AH. 
 Mir Seyyed Ali Hamedani Mystics and followers of Sirusluk of the seventh century AH. 
 Mirzadeh Eshghi is one of the shining stars of poetry and prose of the play during the Constitutional Revolution.
 Bu Ali Sina, one of the rare scientists and geniuses of the time, was born in 370 AH in Khoramisin, Bukhara. He entered this city in 406 AH when Hamedan was the capital of the buyid, and after a while, Shams al-Dawla Dailami made him his minister. During his stay in Hamedan, Bu Ali Sina taught at the city's large school and had the opportunity to complete many of his writings.

 The tomb of Bu Ali Sina is now located in a square of the same name in Hamedan.

Contemporary people 

Abolhassan Banisadr (1933–2021), economist, politician, and the first post-revolutionary elected president of the Islamic Republic of Iran
Ahmad NikTalab (1934–2020), a famous contemporary poet
Aminollah Rezaei (1936–2004), poet, the Father of Iranian Surrealism
Amir Nosrat'ollah Balakhanlou, born in Tehran — two-time mayor and MP for Hamadan City (1950s and early 1960s)
Amir-Shahab Razavian (born 1965), film director, writer and producer
Baba-Taher-e Oryan, a famous poet (1100 A.C)
Ein-Alqozat Hamadani (1098–1131), a great philosopher and sufist (1100 A.C)
Ehsan Yarshater (1920–2018), historian, scientists, and founder of Encyclopædia Iranica
Fakhr-al-Din Iraqi, celebrated poet (1300 A.C)
Fazlollah Zahedi (1892–1963), military general
Fereydoun Moshiri, contemporary poet (originally from Hamadan, but born in Tehran)
Hossein Noori Hamedani (born 1925), Iranian Shia Marja
Hanieh Tavassoli (born 1979), actress
Joseph Emin (born 1726), a major activist in the attempts to liberate Armenia during the 18th century
Mir Sayyid Ali Hamadani (1312–1384), poet and scholar
Mirzadeh Eshghi (1893–1924), a celebrated nationalist poet
Moshfegh Hamadani (1912–2009), writer, journalist and translator
Parviz Parastouei, acclaimed actor
Rashid-al-Din Hamadani, Persian statesman, historian and physician of the 13th-14th centuries
Shirin Ebadi, lawyer and the 2003 Nobel Peace Laureate
Samuel Rahbar, scientist
Wojtek, a bear who was born in Hamedan and would grow up to become a corporal in the Polish army during World War 2.
Viguen, known as the king of Persian pop and jazz music

International relations

Twin towns – Sister cities
Hamadan is twinned with:

See also
 Ganj Nameh
 Mir Sayyid Ali Hamadani
 Baba Taher Orian
 Ali Sadr Cave
 Hamadan Airport
 Wojtek (soldier bear)

References

Bibliography
Bibliography of the history of Hamadan

External links

 Ecbatana, Photos from Iran, Livius.
 Gandj Nameh, Photos from Iran, Livius.
 The Bisotun inscription, Photos from Iran, Livius .
 Photos from Hamadan City 
 Hamadan City
 Hamadan: Older than history
 Hamadan; Capital of Median Empire
 Iconos satellite photo (January, 2005)
 Google Satellite Picture
 Hamedan Cultural Heritage Organization 
 Hegmataneh Official Website 
 Hamadān entries in the

 
Populated places in Hamadan County
Cities in Hamadan Province
Iranian provincial capitals
Babylonian captivity
Populated places along the Silk Road